This is the list of mayors of Pelotas, Rio Grande do Sul, Brazil.

References

Notes 

Pelotas